Ovenden is a village in West Yorkshire, England, next to Boothtown and Illingworth about a mile from Halifax town centre. It is also a Calderdale Ward whose population at the 2011 Census was 12,351.

Ovenden railway station on the Halifax and Ovenden Junction Railway Line closed in 1955 to passengers but the line remained open until 1960 to allow freight train to access St Paul's station on the west side of Halifax.

Ovenden rugby league club competed in the National Conference League up until 2015 before having to withdraw due to a lack of players and finance. Similarly, Ovenden West Riding football team folded in August 2016 for the same reason of not having enough players to field a team.

The Ridings School in Ovenden gained national notoriety as one of the worst schools in the UK. It closed in 2009 and parts of it have been converted into a doctors surgery and sports centre with rest of the school leased to a not-for-profit organisation, Threeways, who plan to open a community hub with fitness, sport and entertainment facilities.

Champion Jack Dupree 
In the 1970s and 1980s, Ovenden was the home of New Orleans blues and boogie woogie pianist Champion Jack Dupree. A bronze plaque has been erected in his memory.

See also
Listed buildings in Ovenden

References

External links

Areas of Halifax, West Yorkshire
Villages in West Yorkshire
Wards of Calderdale